Yashahime: Princess Half-Demon is a Japanese anime television series produced by Sunrise and is the anime spinoff sequel to Inuyasha: The Final Act. On March 20, 2021, a second season of the series was announced following the end of the first one. The second season, subtitled Yashahime: Princess Half-Demon – The Second Act, aired from October 2, 2021, to March 26, 2022. From episodes 25–37, the first opening theme is "ReBorn" performed by NEWS while the first ending theme is "Toumei na Sekai" performed by Little Glee Monster. From episode 38–48, the second opening theme is "Kyōmei" (Resonance) performed by SixTONES, while the second ending theme is "Anaaki no Sora" (Perforated Sky) by Adieu (Moka Kamishiraishi).

On November 4, 2021, Viz Media announced an English dub for the season, which premiered the next day on Crunchyroll, Funimation and Hulu. The English dub of the season began broadcast on Adult Swim's Toonami programming block beginning on July 31, 2022.


Episode list

Home media release

Japanese

English

Notes

References

2021 Japanese television seasons
2022 Japanese television seasons
Yashahime season 2